The Hound of the Baskervilles is a 2002 television adaptation of Sir Arthur Conan Doyle's 1902 novel of the same name.

Plot

Sherlock Holmes and his companion Dr. Watson investigate the case of an attempted murder inspired by the legend of a fearsome, diabolical hound of supernatural origin on Dartmoor in Devon in England's West Country.

Cast
Richard Roxburgh as Sherlock Holmes
Ian Hart as Doctor Watson
Richard E. Grant as Jack Stapleton
Matt Day as Sir Henry Baskerville
John Nettles as Dr. James Mortimer
Geraldine James as Mrs. Mortimer
Neve McIntosh as Beryl Stapleton
Ron Cook as Mr. Barrymore
Liza Tarbuck as Mrs. Barrymore
 Danny Webb as Inspector Lestrade

Production

Produced by Tiger Aspect Productions, this was the third adaptation of the tale for the BBC, it was shown on BBC One on Boxing Day 2002.  It was directed by David Attwood, and adapted by Allan Cubitt. The film stars Richard Roxburgh as Sherlock Holmes and Ian Hart as Doctor Watson. Hart would play Watson again in the 2004 TV film Sherlock Holmes and the Case of the Silk Stocking, also written by Cubitt. The hound was a mix of animatronics and computer generated images and was created by the same team, Crawley Creatures and Framestore, that provided the dinosaurs for Walking with Dinosaurs and The Lost World.

This version diverges from the novel in a few instances, such as Sir Henry not being involved in the final attempt to entrap Stapleton, Stapleton murdering his wife and Stapleton being shot dead by Watson just before the former can shoot a mire-trapped Holmes. The film is set in the time period the original tale was published as opposed to when it was originally set. It portrays a séance performed by Dr. Mortimer's wife, a scene which did not appear in the original novel, though a similar scene did appear in the 1939 Basil Rathbone version of the film. The characters of Frankland and his daughter Laura Lyons are completely omitted from the film.

Critical reaction
Richard Scheib of The Science-Fiction, Horror and Fantasy Film Review called the film "one of the best Sherlock Holmes screen adaptations to date, and arguably the best of all screen versions of The Hound of the Baskervilles that we have." Pamela Troy of CultureVulture.net wrote, "There's a lot that may outrage fans of the original novel, but this is, nonetheless, a respectful, interesting, and worthwhile adaptation." Charles Prepolec of the Sherlock Holmes fansite BakerStreetDozen.com wrote, "In the end, it is a compelling, if somewhat infuriating, film to watch. Not a great Holmes film, and certainly not the greatest version of this story, but it is fascinating television drama." The A.V. Club called the film "A very interesting, if not completely successful, adaptation."

References

External links

PBS Masterpiece Theatre summary.  

Films based on The Hound of the Baskervilles
2002 television films
2002 films
British television films
British mystery films
2000s crime films
BBC television dramas
Sherlock Holmes films
Films directed by David Attwood (film director)
2000s English-language films
2000s British films